Choppee is an unincorporated community in Georgetown County, in the U.S. state of South Carolina.

History
The community was named for its location on Choppee Creek.

References

Unincorporated communities in South Carolina
Unincorporated communities in Georgetown County, South Carolina